Female is a 1933 novel by Donald Henderson Clarke. It was translated into Czech as Samička : Román ženy (1934).

The novel was used as the basis of the feature film Female, produced the same year by Warner Bros. and directed by Michael Curtiz.

Plot 
The story is about the rise of determined, emotionally hardened Margy Kane (daughter of a fencer and a parlor maid) from the back alleys of New England to her married life on Park Avenue.

Reception 
The book was declared obscene by the Brooklyn Appellate Division of the New York Supreme Court in 1935.

References

1933 American novels
Vanguard Press books
American novels adapted into films
Obscenity controversies in literature